7th Infantry Regiment and later titled as the 7th Infantry Regiment of the Samogitian Duke Butigeidis was a Lithuanian Army infantry regiment that saw combat in the Lithuanian Wars of Independence. It was formed on 9 January 1919 and disbanded in 1940.

History 
The unit began forming on 9 January 1919, when a company was formed from the Kommandantur in and around Kaunas. This company later grew to be the Kaunas Battalion. Its commander was the officer J. Petrauskas.

The regiment was founded on 1 July 1919.

Lithuanian Wars of Independence

War against Bermontians 
In October 1919, the Kaunas Battalion, led by officer Edvardas Adamkavičius, fought against the Bermontians near Baisiogala, Raseiniai and Tauragė.

Polish-Lithuanian War 
On 9 January 1920, a year after the formation's beginning, the battalion was transformed into a regiment, being given the name of the Samogitian Duke Butigeidis. The regiment was moved to Ukmergė to defend the Vepriai-Kurkliai line against the Polish Army. On 15 July, while the Polish were running from the Bolshevik onslaught, a part of the regiment, commanded by lieutenant J. Černius marched into Vilnius, and on August 26, the whole regiment garrisoned Vilnius. Later, the regiment was moved near Gardinas, but after Polish victories, the regiment was driven back to Vilnius. There was a brief respite because of the Suwałki Agreement.

Żeligowski's Mutiny 
Żeligowski's soldiers pushed the 7th Regiment out of Vilnius, from where it retreated towards Ukmergė. In addition to other Lithuanian units, the regiment took part in the Battle of Giedraičiai, where the Polish Army was heavily defeated, stopping its offensive to Kaunas. 

According to the plan of the commanding officer of the 7th regiment's battalion Teodoras Balnas, on the night of November 18–19, 200 selected soldiers surrounded the Polish , attacking from the flanks and behind. The Polish unit was surrounded from 3 sides and was severely defeated. The Lithuanians took 200 prisoners of war, 2 artillery guns, 24 HMGs, around 200 wagons, 50 horses, 250 rifles, 9 mortars and 24 field kitchens.

After the end of the war, the regiment guarded the demarcation line in the surroundings of Ukmergė and Trakai.

Klaipėda revolt 
In 1923, parts of the regiment were involved in the Klaipėda revolt, and hence were stationed in Klaipėda and Šilutė.

Interwar 
On 30 April 1934, the regiment's HQ and 2nd Battalion were moved from Klaipėda to Tauragė, and the 1st Battalion was used for the recreation the 6th Infantry Regiment of the Pilėnai Duke Margis.

After a short while, the 7th Infantry Regiment had two battalions again, with a total of 1,500 officers and men serving.

The regiment was part of the 3rd Infantry Division.

Flag 
In 1928, the regiment was given a flag of the 3rd class of the Order of Vytautas Cross with the inscription "Meilė Lietuvos mūs žingsnius telydi" (English: Love of Lithuania guides our steps).

Armament 
The regiment was armed with M98 rifles and MG 08 machine guns.

Commanders 

 1920 - Colonel Edvardas Adamkavičius
 1921 - Colonel Julius Čaplikas
 1923 - Colonel Pranas Kaunas
 1924 - Colonel Petras Genys
 1939 - Colonel Antanas Breimelis

References

Sources

See also 

 7-asis pėstininkų Žemaičių kunigaikščio Butegeidžio pulkas 1929 metais (video)
 http://www.archyvai.lt/lt/fondai/kariuomene/lcva_f520.html

Military units and formations established in 1919
Military units and formations disestablished in 1940
Infantry regiments of Lithuania